The Ministry of Geology (Mingeo) was a government ministry in the Soviet Union.

Established as Committee for Geology in 1939; renamed Ministry of Geology in 1946; responsible for the exploration and surveying of the geological resources of the USSR, the expansion of proven mineral reserves, and the development of new technology. In September 1987 the Ministry changed from union-republic ministry to all-union ministry.

List of ministers
Source:
 Ilya Malyshev (14.6.1946 - 11.4.1949)
 Pyotr Zakharov (11.4.1949 - 15.3.1953)
 Pyotr Antropov (31.8.1953 - 24.2.1962)
 Aleksandr Sidorenko (27.2.1962 - 29.12.1975)
 Yevgeny Kozlovsky (29.12.1975 - 17.7.1989)
 Grigory Gabrielyants (17.7.1989 - 24.8.1991)

References

External links
 
 

Geology